And the Winner Is is a British radio comedy program.

And the Winner Is may also refer to:

 "And the Winner Is..." (Benson), an episode of the American television series Benson
 "And the Winner Is..." (The Legend of Korra), an episode of the American animated television series The Legend of Korra
 "And the Winner Is..." (Rugrats), an episode of the American animated television series Rugrats
 "And the Winner Is... (The Oscars of 1963)", an episode of the American television series Feud
 "And the Wiener Is...", an episode of the animated comedy series Family Guy
 And the Winner Is..., a 1987 album by American singer Selena
 "And the Winner Is...", a children's book by American rapper, actor, author, and entrepreneur LL Cool J, published in 2002